Sheikhpura Junction railway station, station code SHK, is a railway station under Danapur railway division of East Central Railway. Sheikhpura is connected to metropolitan areas of India, by the Gaya–Kiul line. Station is located in Sheikhpura city in Sheikhpura district in the Indian state of Bihar. Due to its location on the Gaya–Kiul line, many trains coming from Gaya and other cities stops here. Sheikhpura is well connected with nearby cities Gaya,  and Kiul through daily passenger and express train services.

A new branch line between  railway station and Sheikhpura railway station via Neora, Jatdumri, Daniyawan, Bihar Sharif, Sheikhpura is under construction in which Bihar Sharif–Daniyawan section was partially started in 2015.

History
Several years before the Grand Chord was built, a connection from the Howrah–Delhi main line to Gaya was developed in 1900 and the South Bihar Railway Company (operated by EIR) had laid a line from Lakhisarai to Gaya in 1879. The Grand Chord was opened on 6 December 1906.

Structure
There are only three platforms in the Sheikhpura Junction railway station. The platforms are interconnected with a single foot overbridge.

Electrification and doubling of track
Feasibility studies for the electrification of the Manpur–Tilaiya–Kiul section were announced in the rail budget for 2010–11 and the electrification work of single track is going on starting 2015–16. Electrification of single line from Gaya to Kiul have been completed in July 2018. It has been completed in two phases. In first phase Tilaiya to Warisaliganj have been completed and in the other phase Warisaliganj to Lakhisarai. A special MEMU train was flagged on 22 October 2018 by State Railway Minister Mr Manoj Sinha. Track doubling is in progress and it is expected to be completed by March 2020.

Nearest airports

The nearest airports to Sheikhpura junction are:

Lok Nayak Jayaprakash Airport, Patna 
Gaya Airport

See also
 Sheikhpura city
 Sheikhpura district

References 

Danapur railway division
Railway junction stations in Bihar
Railway stations in Sheikhpura district